Gründer or Grunder is a German-language surname and a variant of the topographic surname Grund denoting an inhabitant. It may refer to:
Anita Grunder, American geologist
Hans Grunder (1956), Swiss politician
Hermann A. Grunder (1931), Swiss-American nuclear and accelerator physicist
Nils Gründer (born 1997), German politician
René Gründer (1975), German sociologist

References 

German-language surnames
German toponymic surnames
Swiss-German surnames